Baba Sissoko (born 8 March 1963) is a percussionist from Mali.

Career
Born and raised in Bamako, from childhood, he played tamani, often accompanying the traditional female griot during wedding and other traditional ceremonies.

In 1985, he toured internationally with the prestigious Instrumental Ensemble of Mali orchestra, playing the tamani and ngoni. In 1991, he founded his trio, Baba Sissoko & Taman Kan, and began extensively collaborating with top   Malian artists and international musicians. His work with Habib Koité is notable as their collaboration lasted 12 years and was widely celebrated. In 1995, Baba Sissoko released his first album with Tama-Kan.

Baba Sissoko's Taman Kan bandmates are Roger Sabal Lecco (who has played bass with Manu Dibango, Miriam Makeba, Fela Kuti, Francis Bebey, Lucio Dalla, and Louisiana Red), and Reynaldo Hernandez (who has played percussion with the Conjunto Folklórico Nacional of Cuba and the Gipsy Kings). The trio celebrates their own cultures (Manding, Bambara people, Sonrai, Yoruba, and Kongo), and incorporates blues, jazz and rock elements as well.

To date, Baba Sissoko has recorded and released more than five albums. He also has taught traditional drum in Brussels, Belgium, and led conferences for the University of Calabria - Art, Music, and Spectacle Centre in Italy. He has lived in Italy since the late 1990s.

In 2015 he collaborated with DJ Khalab on the Khalab & Baba album.

In 2017, he collaborated with Mighty Mo Rodgers on the album, Griot Blues.

Discography 
 Baba Sissoko & Taman Kan, Taman Kan, 1995
 Djana, 1999
 Baba Sissoko & Taman Kan, Live in Studio, 2000
 Baba Sissoko and Mario Artese, Griots, 2001
 Djeliya, 2004
 Baba Sissoko with Famoudou Don Moye & Maurizio Capone, Folk Bass Spirit Suite, 2004
 Baba Sissoko Trio, Bolokan, 2005
 Afro Jazz Live, 2005
 Baba Sissoko & Taman Kan, Mali Music, 2005
 Djekafo, 2006
 Baba Sissoko with Eloi Boudimont (Fanfare et Chouer), Mali Mali, 2007
 Baba Sissoko Jazz Ensemble, Bamako Jazz, 2007
 Bibisa Solo – Moi je m'amuse, 2008
 Aka Moon, Baba Sissoko & Black Machine, Culture Griot, 2009
 Baba Sissoko e Il Pozzo di San Patrizio, The Eyes over the World, 2010
 Baba Sissoko Buschwerk & The Masters of Groove, Trance, 2011
 Mali Tamani Revolution, 2011
 Sahel, 2011
 Baba Sissoko, Officina Zoé, Taranta nera, 2012
 Baba Sissoko Afroblues, African Griot Groove, 2012
 Baba Sissoko Djeli Mah Damba Koroba, Baba et sa maman, 2013
 Baba Sissoko, Saulius Petreikis, Indre Jurgeleviciute, Laurita Peleniute, Viktoras Diawara, Ma Lituanie, 2013
 Tchi Wara, 2014
 Baba Sissoko with Antonello Salis & Famoudou Don Moye, Jazz (R)Evolution, 2015
 Three Gees, 2015
 Baba Sissoko with Mighty Mo Rodgers, Griot Blues, 2017
 Amadran, 2019

As guest
(Incomplete)
 Art Ensemble of Chicago, We Are On the Edge (Pi, 2019)

References

External links 
 
Biography on africultures.com

1963 births
Living people
Malian musicians
People from Bamako
21st-century Malian people